Mahmoud Wahid El Sayed Mohamed (born 19 June 1994), is an Egyptian footballer who plays for Egyptian Premier League side Tala'ea El Gaish on loan from Al Ahly as a left-back.

Honours and achievements

Club
Al Ahly
 Egyptian Premier League: 2018–19 , 2019-20
 Egypt Cup: 2019–20
 Egyptian Super Cup: 2018
 CAF Champions League: 2019-20, 2020-21
 FIFA Club World Cup: Third-Place 2020, Third-Place 2021

References

1994 births
Living people
People from Ismailia
People from Ismailia Governorate
Egyptian footballers
Association football fullbacks
Egyptian Premier League players
Egypt international footballers
Ismaily SC players
ENPPI SC players
Telephonat Beni Suef SC players
Misr Lel Makkasa SC players
Al Ahly SC players

Honours
Al Ahly
 CAF Champions League: 2019–20, 2020-21